Neacerea albiventus is a moth in the subfamily Arctiinae. It was described by Herbert Druce in 1898. It is found in Minas Gerais, Brazil.

References

Moths described in 1898
Arctiinae